Lan Xing (born 10 December 1990 in Sichuan) is a Chinese rifle shooter. He competed in the 50 m rifle three positions event at the 2012 Summer Olympics, where he placed 29th.

References

1990 births
Living people
Chinese male sport shooters
Olympic shooters of China
Shooters at the 2012 Summer Olympics
Sport shooters from Sichuan
Asian Games medalists in shooting
Shooters at the 2014 Asian Games
Universiade medalists in shooting
Asian Games gold medalists for China
Medalists at the 2014 Asian Games
Universiade gold medalists for China
Medalists at the 2013 Summer Universiade
21st-century Chinese people